Timothy Peter Lambesis (born November 21, 1980) is an American musician and producer, best known as the founding member and lead vocalist of American metalcore band As I Lay Dying. He also had a solo/side thrash metal project in tribute to actor Arnold Schwarzenegger, Austrian Death Machine, in which he performed all the instruments. He also formed a death metal band called Pyrithion and played guitar for Society's Finest and Point of Recognition. 

Lambesis was a judge for the 8th and 10th annual Independent Music Awards to support independent artists' careers.

Lambesis was arrested in 2013 after attempting to hire an undercover police officer to murder his wife. He pled guilty in 2014 and was sentenced to serve six years in prison. Lambesis was released on parole in December 2016.

Since his release, he has reunited the band As I Lay Dying with his former members and released an album: Shaped by Fire.

Personal life
Lambesis grew up in Southern California and was voted "Most Like Jesus" by classmates when he attended Santa Fe Christian School in Solana Beach, California as a teen. He attended Liberty University for a time and majored in religious studies.

Lambesis is a bodybuilder and started his own YouTube fitness channel. He is also heavily tattooed. His tattoos include a "rocking Jesus," and cyborg Arnold Schwarzenegger, a Koi fish swimming upstream, which represents a quest for meaning and fulfillment, Hebrew writing, a cross, Jesus Christ in clouds, and his largest (completely covering his back), a samurai fighting a tiger, which represents the battle between reason and instinct.

Lambesis married Meggan Murphy in June 2004. They have two daughters and a son all adopted from Ethiopia.

Lambesis has previously stated on multiple occasions that he is a Christian. During an August 2010 radio interview on The Full Armor of God Broadcast, Lambesis said "I can only really write about what I'm passionate about in life, so naturally my faith, my belief in the teachings of Jesus and his resurrection come across in our lyrics." He was described as a "follower of Jesus" once more.

Starting in 2012, Lambesis has made several statements indicating a change in his religious beliefs: in a post on his personal Tumblr page explaining some of the lyrics from the As I Lay Dying album Awakened (released September 2012), Lambesis stated that his studies of theology had led him to the conclusion that "tradition and truth are often at odds with each other". While he noted that he "didn't hate all religious belief" and was "still inspired by the words of [Jesus]", he was finding it "very difficult for to outline exactly who it is that's worth siding with", and was increasingly regarding "the god of tradition and ritual that I grew up with as less and less of a probable truth". He also quoted the book Pagan Christianity by George Barna and Frank Viola, noting that both "Protestant and Catholic denominations have poisonous roots".

In August 2012, Lambesis sent an email to his wife, Meggan Murphy-Lambesis, while on tour with As I Lay Dying in which he stated he no longer loved her, had engaged in an extramarital affair, and "no longer believed in God".<ref>Affairs Alleged in Christian Metal Singer's Murder-for-Hire Case. NBC-7 San Diego. Accessed 27 Feb 14. "In an email sent in August, Lambesis told his wife he had been having an affair and no longer loved her the prosecutor said in court. 'He also told her he no longer believes in God," Grasso said.'"</ref> They separated the same month. She filed papers in San Diego Superior Court one month later in September 2012 seeking a dissolution of their marriage, according to an online court database. In divorce papers, Meggan stated that Lambesis was obsessed with bodybuilding, spending "endless hours at the gym", and was wasting "thousands of dollars on tattoos". She also alleged that he had become "dangerously distracted" while watching their children, including falling asleep while they played in their pool, and had taken two last-minute trips to Florida to see an extramarital girlfriend.As I Lay Dying Singer Tim Lambesis Pleads Guilty In Plot to Kill Wife. Retrieved February 9, 2014.
When not on tour, Lambesis lived in Del Mar, California. Murphy and their children live in Encinitas.

Solicitation of murder
On May 7, 2013, Lambesis was arrested in Oceanside, California, for attempting to hire a hitman to murder his estranged wife Meggan Murphy, and, according to the San Diego County Sheriff's Department, was charged with soliciting "an undercover detective to kill his wife." Lambesis approached someone at a gym and asked if he knew anyone who would kill his wife. Lambesis met with the undercover agent posing as a hitman, code name "Red", according to Deputy District Attorney Claudia Grasso. "Red" asked Lambesis if he wanted his wife of eight years gone, and Lambesis replied, "Yes, that's what I want." He then gave [the] undercover agent an envelope containing US$1,000 for expenses, pictures of his wife, her address, the code to get through a gate, and the date on which to kill her. Lambesis had directed the detective he believed to be a hitman to kill his wife while he was with his children so he would have an alibi. He agreed to pay $20,000 for the hit.

On May 9, 2013, Lambesis pled not guilty to a felony charge of solicitation of murder and was ordered held on $3 million bail despite prosecutors deeming Lambesis a "flight risk" and "danger to the public". Lambesis' bandmates, representatives from management and Metal Blade Records, and band attorney Ian Friedman were in attendance at his arraignment. According to the District Attorney of the case, an audio recording of the transaction between Lambesis and the undercover detective exists and was reportedly used at the trial. A readiness conference was set for June 10, 2013, and a preliminary court date was scheduled for July 10, 2013. During the month of his initial arrest, Lambesis pled "not guilty" and his lawyer stated: "His thought processes were devastatingly affected by his steroid use." A new bail hearing was held for Lambesis on May 17, 2013, at which defense attorney Tom Warwick had bail reduced from $3 million to $2 million. Lambesis was released on bail on May 30. Lambesis was ordered to wear a GPS monitor, was subject to strict travel restrictions, and was unable to see or communicate with his wife and three children. As a result, As I Lay Dying's mid-2013 tour with Killswitch Engage was cancelled.

On February 25, 2014, Lambesis changed his plea from "not guilty" to "guilty" and was sentenced to six years in prison on May 16, 2014 and credited with 48 days for time served.

While on house-arrest, Lambesis made a lengthy post on his personal blog in which he stated that (due to the ongoing criminal case) he was unable to "explain more about my case or to explicitly state what my current worldview is", but noted that "after my incarceration, I found myself re-evaluating topics that I had previously sworn I would never waste my time looking at again." Lambesis stated that "I grew up in a Christian home and held that belief myself for many years. In the process of sincerely trying to defend that belief in a scholarly way and shortly after finishing my degree, I felt that it was unreasonable to call myself a Christian in light of the evidence. Many As I Lay Dying fans picked up on the not-so-subtle hints at my worldview change in a couple songs on Awakened. It was never really hidden." In June 2014, Lambesis came out as an atheist, claiming that he, along with other members of the band, just kept pretending to be Christian just to sell records, a claim called slanderous and defamatory by another member of the band. He even recalls feeling awkward when asked for their testimonies and when fans ask to pray with them. According to Lambesis, his renunciation of Christianity made it easier to have an affair. However, since his arrest the band has released a statement that Lambesis "has spent much of the last year re-evaluating what originally convinced him to abandon belief in God. After much brokenness and repentance he sees things differently, considers himself a follower of Jesus, someone submitted to the will of God, or whatever you want to call it," adding, "That's for him to talk about when he's comfortable and only time will tell if he is sincere."

In 2016, after two years in prison, Lambesis filed a lawsuit against two Southern California detention centers for gross negligence in denying his request for anastrozole, a drug he'd been prescribed to fight the side effects of withdrawal from steroids. The lawsuit alleges that as a result of the failure to provide him with the drug, Lambesis developed breasts and underwent severe emotional distress. His request for punitive damages of $35 million was dismissed in September 2016, but his claims of medical negligence have yet to be tried.

He was released on parole on December 17, 2016. He married Amanda Dubord in April 2017. They divorced in 2020, after which Lambesis married Dany Ciara in 2022.

Musical career
Lambesis started his musical career while he was still in high school, playing bass in the first few bands he was in. He and Matt Carlson (drums) formed the band Against the Mark, where Lambesis would become the band's vocalist. The two would get a full band together, including bassist Jon Jameson. The band changed their name to Life Once Lost, but only for a short time, until they entered an indefinite hiatus. Lambesis left in 2000 to join Society's Finest, but only for a brief time, as they did not have plans to tour. Lambesis returned to California to restart Life Once Lost, but with a whole new lineup. The band discovered A Life Once Lost, which caused the band to change their name to As I Lay Dying. Lambesis hired Jordan Mancino, former drummer of Edge of Mortality, and Evan White. In 2001, Lambesis and Mancino joined Point of Recognition and recorded on the album Day of Defeat in 2002. The two quit soon after to further pursue As I Lay Dying.

Over the years, the band went through many lineup changes. Lambesis and Mancino were the only remaining original members and constant members until 2003, when 19-year-old guitarist Phil Sgrosso joined the band. The next year, in 2004, the band hired Nick Hipa as the band's lead guitarist. Hipa was playing previously with Evelynn, a band that was signed to Pluto Records, As I Lay Dying's former label. Bassist Clint Norris was, most likely, the band's most consistent bassist until his departure in 2007 and the introduction of Josh Gilbert. The five of them recorded and released An Ocean Between Us, including "Nothing Left", which was Grammy-nominated for "Best Metal Performance". In 2008, Lambesis and Destroy the Runner vocalist Chad Ackerman formed Austrian Death Machine, a parody metal band based around Arnold Schwarzenegger. The two recorded two releases, Total Brutal and A Very Brutal Christmas the same year. The next year saw the release of Double Brutal.

The band wrote and recorded The Powerless Rise, which was released in 2010 to much critical acclaim. In 2011, Austrian Death Machine released Jingle All the Way. Lambesis would release three albums over the next three years; Awakened with As I Lay Dying (2012), The Burden of Sorrow by Pyrithion, a side project with members of Allegaeon and The Famine (2013), and Triple Brutal with Austrian Death Machine (2014). In 2014, all of Lambesis' projects went on hiatus, due to his criminal acts.

In 2017, Lambesis resurrected As I Lay Dying, initially rumoured with all new members. After consolidation with the old members, the band reunited in form of the old lineup. On June 7, 2018, the band released a new single, "My Own Grave". On April 12, 2019, As I Lay Dying released another single, "Redefined", and on September 20, 2019, the band released their seventh studio album, Shaped by Fire.

Discography

with As I Lay DyingBeneath the Encasing of Ashes (2001)Frail Words Collapse (2003)Shadows Are Security (2005)A Long March: The First Recordings (compilation, 2006)An Ocean Between Us (2007)The Powerless Rise (2010)Decas (compilation, 2011)Awakened (2012)
 Shaped by Fire (2019)

as/with Austrian Death MachineTotal Brutal (2008)A Very Brutal Christmas (EP, 2008)Double Brutal (2009)Jingle All the Way (EP, 2011)Triple Brutal (2014)

Guest appearances
 "After the Fall", from The Beginning of the End (2006) – by Sworn Enemy
 "Declaration", from Declaration (2008) – by Bleeding Through
 "God Rocky, Is This Your Face?", from Almost Home (2009) – by Evergreen Terrace
 "Orphans", from There Will Be Violence (2010) – by Impending Doom
 "Desire", from Eternal (2010) – by War of Ages
 "Constance", from Dead Throne (2011) – by The Devil Wears Prada
 "With a Resounding Voice", from Jasta (2011) – by Jamey Jasta
 "Oblivion", from Oblivion (2021) - by Ov Sulfur

Credits as record producer
 As I Lay Dying – Beneath the Encasing of Ashes Sworn Enemy – The Beginning of the End Sworn Enemy – Maniacal Sworn Enemy – Total World Domination Zao – Awake? Impending Doom – The Serpent Servant Impending Doom – There Will Be Violence Chelsea Grin – Desolation of Eden War of Ages – Arise and Conquer War of Ages – Eternal Molotov Solution – The Harbinger Sea of Treachery – Wonderland Carnifex – Until I Feel Nothing Underneath the Gun – Forfeit Misfortunes Wolves at the Gate - Eclipse''

References

External links
 Tim Lambesis' blog
 
 

1980 births
21st-century American bass guitarists
21st-century American drummers
21st-century American male singers
21st-century American singers
American atheists
American former Christians
American bodybuilders
American heavy metal bass guitarists
American heavy metal drummers
American heavy metal guitarists
American heavy metal singers
American male bass guitarists
American people convicted of attempted murder
American performers of Christian music
American prisoners and detainees
As I Lay Dying (band) members
Guitarists from California
Living people
Musicians from San Diego
People convicted of soliciting murder
People from Del Mar, California
People from Solana Beach, California
Prisoners and detainees of California
Record producers from California
Singers from California
Songwriters from California
American male songwriters
Burn survivors